Kang Ching-jung, or commonly known as Kang Kang, is a Taiwanese entertainer, singer and television host. He was first discovered by Chang Fei during a TV show performance. Before entering Taiwanese showbiz, Kang switched jobs many times. He was first a military policeman (MP), a salesman, and then a pub singer for many years. He entered a singing contest in 1997 and won first place with his band. They released an EP in the same year.

Career 
It was not until 1998 that Kang began his career in entertainment. Chang Fei praised Kang for a brilliant and quick-witted performance on his popular show, Dragon Brother, Tiger Brother, and agreed to mentor Kang. Kang later met and began working with Jacky Wu.

Kang released his first album, Tears Inducing (催淚) in June 1999. The album was a mild success, due to his soul-searching musical direction and humble low-range vocal. However, Kang's songwriting was overshadowed by his obnoxious TV image as a comedian who used foul language, impersonation and slapstick humour as a means to win the audience's heart. The general public tended to focus primarily on his on-screen presence, saying that a singer must have style and Kang was lacking the magic within a singer. The reason for that was not a lack of media exposure or TV coverage, it was due to Kang's public image. Critics had pounded him as "ugly looking and badly dressed, with a tumbling voice that can't speak with proper volume and speed". Kang had since been working diligently to improve his voice command and speed, as the hard work eventually paid off. His popularity increased as he gained more TV exposure from the support of his boss, Jacky Wu as they appeared in countless classic TV hits such as "TV Citizen", "Electric Playground" and "Let's Handcuff Him".

In 2000, Kang released his second album, Happy Birdy Days (快樂鳥日子). The response was overwhelming and produced many classic songs, such as "Happy Birdy Days", which is a must sing song in many karaoke places. In 2001, Kang released his third album, Dream Come True (圓夢), and produced mild success. Following it was a 2002 live album, Kang Kang's Special (康康的濕背秀).

Kang's career blossomed when he co-hosted with Jackie Wu on the hit-show "Sunday Night 8 o' Clock" (周日八點黨). The show was an instant hit, claiming as the sole champion during the Sunday late night TV slot for more than six years straight. Its popularity was due to its renovating structure from in-studio recording to outdoor recording. Adding to that was the introduction of "Crossroad" (食字路口), the outdoor game element that leads a group of guests to famous night markets and restaurants. The game starts with three teams, each led by one TV host, and they must follow certain rules in order to win the race. The rule is simple: each team is first given a title of a single food item and then they must come out a series of 8 food items correlating to the last letter of each item, for example Fried Rice -> Rice Dumpling-> Dumpling And Noodle -> Noodle Soup...and so on. There is an option that grants a team to use 7-11 as a life-saver, but it can only be used once. This newly introduced element was a first in TV game shows, because the Taiwanese culture had its love for food and its night markets for a long time, and what better way to advertise the culture in front of a live audience. Kang was easily the star of the show, as he often mimicked famous stars and singers with his uncanny ability to sing and make eccentric facial expressions at the same time. Often his teammates would respond with tears and laughter during their brief stint as they went on during stages of the game. Coincidentally, Kang's team would often round up as the winner of the show, which later on generated mixed emotions with another host, "NONO". However, the show lasted a long run and ended in 2008.

In 2005, Kang released his fifth album, Who Gives a Damn About Your Mother's Marriage (管你媽媽嫁給誰). It did poorly in both commercial sales and critical acclaim. In the same year, Kang hit bottom low with his TV career, as he was kicked off from Zhang Fei's show "Big Brother in Showbizz" (綜藝大哥大) due to creative differences. Even though he had the most TV offers in the same year, his popularity declined due to negative tabloid exposure. Critics often panned him as "egotistically self-minded, a language abuser, and arrogant as a mule". Worse still is that he was often spotted  in pubs and other adult-oriented places by paparazzi. He was also hampered by the media as a playboy, often hailing his own sexual prowess and innuendos in public. Kang responded with the remark that his behaviour was only for the sake of the show.

In the spring of 2006, Kang Kang reinvented his long-term negative image by losing some weight and concentrating on his own TV shows. In addition, he was romantically involved with his fellow TV assistant. Kang Kang married in 2011 and is now a father of one child. He has toured with Frankie Kao and Jacky Wu as "The Three Hard Tenors".

References

External links
 Kang Kang's personal weblog

1967 births
Living people
Taiwanese male comedians
Taiwanese male singers
Musicians from Kaohsiung
Taiwanese television personalities